Leslie Silbert is an American writer who has worked as a private investigator. In 2004, she published her first novel The Intelligencer, a spy story based on an incident in the life of the British 16th-century author Christopher Marlowe.

Silbert was inspired to write the novel when studying Elizabethan drama at Oxford University. On returning to New York City, she joined a private investigation business where she was guided by a former CIA agent. After working there for about a year, she left to devote her time to writing her novel.

The Intellegencer has been translated into Dutch as De verspieder, German as Der Marlowe-Code (2004), Polish as Szpieg, wieczny tułacz (2004), Spanish as El informante (2005), Portuguese as A anatomia do segredo (2006), French as Le manuscrit du maître-espion : roman (2007) and  Croatian as Obavještajac (2008).

She is the daughter of Watergate prosecutor Earl J. Silbert.

References

External links
Leslie Silbert's website

Living people
Year of birth missing (living people)
20th-century American novelists
Harvard University alumni
Place of birth missing (living people)
20th-century American women writers
21st-century American women